Makin is an unincorporated community in Warren Township, Huntington County, Indiana.

History
Makin was never properly laid out or platted. A post office was established at Makin in 1882, and remained in operation until it was discontinued in 1902. Abraham S. Makin served as an early postmaster.

Geography

References

Unincorporated communities in Huntington County, Indiana
Unincorporated communities in Indiana